Niklashausen is a district in the German municipality of Werbach, located in the federal state of Baden-Württemberg at the border to Bavaria, Germany. The regional dialect spoken by people in Niklashausen is East Franconian.

Geographical location
Werbach with its district Niklashausen is located in the Taubertal between Tauberbischofsheim, Wertheim (Main) and Würzburg.

History
In the 15th century, Hans Böhm became famous as the Drummer of Niklashausen.

References 

Towns in Baden-Württemberg
Main-Tauber-Kreis